Flashes per minute, or FPM, is simply the number of times a flashing light blinks per minute. Police and emergency vehicles use warning lights with flashing rates that typically fall in a range from 60 to 240 FPM. In North America, grade crossing signals have a flashing rate ranging between 45 to 65 FPM with the ideal rate being 60 FPM.

Persons with photosensitive epilepsy may suffer a seizure in response to a specific flashing frequency, e.g. 420 FPM, but the exact triggering frequency varies across individuals. To minimize the likelihood of an epileptogenic response, flashing rates above 300 FPM (5 Hz) should be avoided (Harding and Jeavons, 1994).

For conversion purposes, 60 FPM = 1 Hz (i.e. a frequency of one per second).

References
Harding G F A & Jeavons P M, 1994. Photosensitive Epilepsy. London: MacKeith Press.

Lighting
Units of frequency